Dyshekov (masculine) or Dyshekova (feminine) is a Russian surname. Notable people with the surname include:

 Aslan Dyshekov (born 1987), Russian footballer
 Khazret Dyshekov (born 1965), Russian footballer and coach

Russian-language surnames